Port Patteson is a harbour and settlement on the island of Vanua Lava in Vanuatu. It was named after John Patteson, the first Bishop of Melanesia.

The capital of Torba Province, Sola, is located on Port Patteson.

References

Torba Province
Populated places in Vanuatu
Ports and harbors of the Pacific Ocean